Vinu Mohan (born 12 May 1986) is an Indian actor who appears in Malayalam cinema. He made his debut with the 2007 film Nivedyam, directed by A. K. Lohithadas. He is the grandson of the actor Kottarakkara Sreedharan Nair, son of actors K. Mohan Kumar and Shobha Mohan, and nephew of actor Sai Kumar.

Early life and family
Vinu Mohan was born to actors K. Mohan Kumar and Shobha Mohan in Kottarakkara, Kerala, India.  He is the grandson of the veteran actor Kottarakkara Sreedharan Nair and nephew of Sai Kumar. Actor Anu Mohan is his younger brother. He attended Government Boys Higher Secondary School in Karunagappalli and Government Model B.H.S.S, Trivandrum.  

Vinu married actress Vidhya Mohan in 2013 after they co-starred in Ee Thirakkinidayil.

Career
He started his acting career with the multilingual film Ajantha, but its release was delayed until 2012. His first release was Nivedyam in 2007, for which he won the Asianet Best Star Pair Award with his costar, Bhama.

Sai Kumar was cast as the villain in the film Cycle, in which Vinu played the lead role along with Vineeth Sreenivasan. In 2009, he acted alongside Mammootty in the film Chattambinadu. He played leading roles in Sultan (2008) and Koottukar (2010). He portrayed the role of Manikuttan in Pulimurugan (2016) starring Mohanlal. In 2017, he acted in Jomonte Suvisheshangal alongside Dulquer Salmaan.

Awards

Filmography

|2022||oru nadan premam  
Alloy ffc |}

Television

References

External links
 
 

Male actors from Kerala
Living people
Male actors in Malayalam cinema
Indian male film actors
1985 births
People from Kollam district
21st-century Indian male actors